Thomas Kennedy (November 2, 1887 – January 19, 1963) was a miner and president of the United Mine Workers of America (UMWA) from 1960 to 1963.

Kennedy was born in 1887 in Lansford, Pennsylvania.  He started work in the mines at the age of 12, breaking large chunks of coal into smaller pieces. He joined the Mine Workers in 1900, and was elected secretary of Local 1738 in 1903. He was elected to the District 7 board in 1908, and as District 7 president in 1910; he served until 1925. During this time, he was UMWA's chief negotiator for contracts with anthracite coal mine owners.

In 1925, he was elected UMWA's secretary-treasurer.  He left that position when he was elected an international vice president in 1947.  During his tenure as a UMWA vice president, he led the battle to convince the American Federation of Labor to embrace social insurance and unemployment insurance.

He was elected lieutenant governor of Pennsylvania in 1934, becoming the first Democrat to hold the office since Chauncey Black left office in 1887. He ran for governor four years later, but was defeated when the state Democratic political machine decided not to support him.

Kennedy was appointed to the National Defense Mediation Board in 1941, but resigned in protest later that year after the board ruled against UMWA in the "captive mines" case.  He was re-appointed in 1942, but resigned again when the board issued its "Little Steel" organizing decision.

After Lewis' retirement in 1960, Kennedy was elected president of the union.  Although Lewis favored W. A. Boyle as his successor, Kennedy was well liked and well known. Kennedy was in failing health, however, and Boyle took over many of the president's duties. In November 1962, Kennedy became too ill to continue his duties and Boyle was named acting president. Kennedy died on January 19, 1963, in Hazleton, Pennsylvania, and Boyle was elected president as his successor.

References
Dubofsky, Warren and Van Tine, Warren. John L. Lewis: A Biography. Reprint ed. Champaign, Ill.: University of Illinois Press, 1992. 
Fink, Gary M., ed. Biographical Dictionary of American Labor. Westport, Ct.: Greenwood Press, 1984. 
Finley, Joseph E. The Corrupt Kingdom: The Rise and Fall of the United Mine Workers. New York City: Simon and Schuster, 1973. 
McGovern, George S. and Guttridge, Leonard F. The Great Coalfield War. Paperback reissue ed. Niwot, Colo.: University Press of Colorado, 2004.

External links

United Mine Workers of America
The Political Graveyard

American coal miners
Presidents of the United Mine Workers
American trade unionists of Irish descent
Lieutenant Governors of Pennsylvania
1887 births
1963 deaths
Pennsylvania Democrats
20th-century American politicians